Khotanian or Khotanese may refer to:
Hotan
The Kingdom of Khotan
The Khotanese language